The Journalist may refer to:
 The Journalist (Bhutan), a weekly newspaper published in Bhutan.
 The Journalist (newspaper), a 19th- and 20th-century American trade publication
 The Journalist (1967 film), a Soviet romantic drama
 The Journalist (1979 film), an Australian sex comedy
 The Journalist (2019 film), a Japanese drama